Nalegga Ridge is a narrow rock ridge marking the north end of Seilkopf Peaks in the Borg Massif, Queen Maud Land. Mapped by Norwegian cartographers from surveys and air photos by Norwegian-British-Swedish Antarctic Expedition (NBSAE) (1949–52) and named Nalegga (the needle ridge).

See also
Knappane Peaks, a string of separated rock peaks just west of Nålegga Ridge

References

External links

Ridges of Queen Maud Land
Princess Martha Coast